The 1992–93 Temple Owls men's basketball team represented Temple University as a member of the Atlantic 10 Conference during the 1992–93 NCAA Division I men's basketball season. The team was led by head coach John Chaney and played their home games at McGonigle Hall. The Owls received an at-large bid to the NCAA tournament as No. 7 seed in the West region. Temple made a run to the Elite Eight but, for the second consecutive season, fell in the tournament to the famed Fab Five of Michigan, 77–72. The team finished with a record of 20–13 (8–6 A-10).

Roster

Schedule

|-
!colspan=9 style=| Regular season

|-
!colspan=9 style=| Atlantic 10 Tournament

|-
!colspan=9 style=| NCAA Tournament

Rankings

References

Temple Owls men's basketball seasons
Temple
Temple
Temple
Temple